The Dolmens on the Upper Reaches of the Huifa River are a collection of more than 80 megalithic tombs found along two tributaries of the Huifa River.

Overview
The dolmens are located in the administrative divisions of Liuhe County and Meihekou City in Tonghua, Jilin. They are distributed throughout the drainage basins of the Yitong and Santong rivers, both tributaries of the Huifa River. Most were built on low-lying mountain ridges. 

More than 80 dolmens have been recorded. The majority were made using a worked granite slab for the floor, three to four rectangular or square slabs as walls, and a large slab that was placed on the top to act as an overhanging roof. Most slabs measure over 1 metre, but the largest is approximately 2 metres. The deceased was sometimes interred inside the dolmen or in a pit below the monument. In the latter cases, the walls of the grave were either made from stone or tamped earth.

Excavations of the burials have discovered human remains, stone arrowheads, and reddish-brown coarse pottery.

Dates
Based on a presumed relationship between the dolmens and other archaeological sites, Hong Feng suggested that they mainly date to the ninth century BCE, with some potentially being built into the fifth century BCE. Yu Xiaohui, however, has argued that the dolmens represent the northernmost point where Northern-style East Asian megaliths are found. As a result, they are probably later than similar structures on the Liaoning Peninsula and may date later to around the fifth century BCE.

Protection
The dolmens were listed as a Major Historical and Cultural Site Protected at the National Level in 2006.

References

Notes

Works cited

Dolmens
Tombs in China
Archaeological sites in China
1st millennium BC in China
Bronze Age cultures of Asia
Cultural history of Korea
Major National Historical and Cultural Sites in Jilin
Buildings and structures in Jilin
Liuhe County